"Jag ser dig" (Swedish for I See You) is a song by Swedish alternative rock band Kent from their tenth studio album Jag är inte rädd för mörkret. It was released as the album's second single on 27 June 2012. Prior to its official release, the song charted at number 33 in Sweden.

Track listing

Charts

References

Kent (band) songs
2012 singles
Songs written by Joakim Berg
2012 songs
Universal Music Group singles
Sonet Records singles